Nantong Zhongnan International Plaza is a skyscraper in Nantong, Jiangsu, China. Construction began in 2008 and ended in 2011.

References

Skyscrapers in Jiangsu
Buildings and structures in Nantong
Skyscraper office buildings in China
Residential skyscrapers in China